The 1969–1970 General Electric strike was a nationwide labor dispute between General Electric and its workers as represented by the independent United Electrical Workers (UE) and the AFL–CIO affiliated International Union of Electrical Workers (IUE). Involving 164,000 workers on average, it was by far the largest and most impactful strike in 1969 in terms of the number of days lost. It began on October 27, 1969, and was won by the workers after 102 days on the picket line. The strike brought together the two rival unions in the most meaningful way since UE was expelled from the Congress of Industrial Organizations (CIO) in 1949.

Impact
UE and IUE led an alliance of unions which broke the back of Boulwarism, GE's aggressive 20-year-long policy of "take-it-or-leave-it" bargaining. Boulwarism was named for Lemuel Boulware, the company's vice president of labor and community relations, who devised the strategy in reaction to UE's success in the 1946 strike, and to capitalize on the bitter divisions, after 1949, in the ranks of GE union members.

In 2012, Business Insider named it one of the most expensive strikes in U.S. history.

References

1969 labor disputes and strikes
1970 labor disputes and strikes
General Electric
United Electrical, Radio and Machine Workers of America
General Electric